The Darqawiyya or Darqawi Sufi order is a revivalist branch of the Shadhiliyah brotherhood which originated in Morocco. The Darqawa comprised the followers of Sheikh Muhammad al-Arabi al-Darqawi (1760–1823) of Morocco. The movement, which became one of the leading Sufi orders (tariqa) in Morocco, exalted poverty and asceticism. It gained widespread support among the rural inhabitants and the urban lower classes. Its popularity was increased by its use of musical instruments in its rituals. In both Morocco and Algeria the Darqawiyya were involved in political activities and protest movements.

It has received little attention from Orientalists compared to other Sufi orders, despite its closeness to Europe and relatively recent history.  The few authors who did write about the Darqawiyya were largely guided by administrative concerns. In their book, Confreries (1897), Depont and Coppolani call them "ferocious sectarians," and "puritans of Islam" (p. 504-5). These judgements can be completed by E. Doutte in L'Islam algerien en 1900, "The Darqawa are thus mendicant derviches. It is a dangerous order, one found in almost all the insurrections that have taken place against governments". In Morocco the vitality of the Darqawa has remained so strong during the past century that it has been said that "the 19th century was the Darqawi century, just as the 18th century had been the Nasiri century." During the same period, the order burgeoned in Sri Lanka, Libya, Egypt, Palestine, Syria and Lebanon.

A branch of the Darqawiyya called the Murabitun exists in the Chiapas, Mexico.

See also
Mohammed al-Harraq al-Alami
Ahmad al-Alawi
Ahmad ibn 'Ajiba
Muhammad ibn al-Habib
Abdalqadir as-Sufi

References

External links
Dar-Sirr.com: Portal to Moroccan Sufism
Editions La Caravane 

Sunni Sufi orders
Darqawi
Shadhili order
Islam in Morocco
19th century in Morocco